Franco Cassano (3 December 1943 – 23 February 2021) was an Italian sociologist and politician. He was full professor of Sociology and Sociology of Cultural and Communicative Processes at the University of Bari Aldo Moro, alongside his academic activity that of essayist and columnist. Among his best-known works Il pensiero meridiano (1996) and L'umiltà del male (2011). In the 2013 political elections he was elected deputy of the XVII legislature of the Italian Republic in the XXI Puglia constituency for the Democratic Party.

References

1943 births
2021 deaths
Italian sociologists
Democratic Party (Italy) politicians
Deputies of Legislature XVII of Italy
Academic staff of the University of Bari